The 2018 Mosconi Cup, (also known as Mosconi Cup XXV) was the 25th edition of the annual nine-ball pool competition between teams representing Europe and the United States. It took place between 4–7 December 2018 at the Alexandra Palace in London, England and was sponsored by partypoker.

The reigning champions were team Europe, who had won the last eight cups, including the 2017 Mosconi Cup 11–4. The event was played with teams of 5, decided by captains, and also performances in the tour. The team's non-playing captains were the same as the previous year: Marcus Chamat for Europe and Johan Ruijsink for the United States. Ruijsink, who had won the Cup as captain with team Europe seven times, was assisted by vice captain Jeremy Jones.

The United States won the Mosconi Cup for the first time since 2009, defeating Europe 11–9, ending an 8-year losing streak for the USA.

Teams
Sources:

The European qualification process saw players play to be picked in the top three places in the European rankings. This initially resulted in the selection of Eklent Kaçi, Mario He and Niels Feijen to Team Europe, who were subsequently joined by the wildcard picks of Albin Ouschan and Jayson Shaw. However, a statement released on 21 November 2018 announced that Mario He had stepped down from the side following a failed drugs test and would be replaced by the next highest-ranked player on the Euro Tour, Alexander Kazakis.

Results

Tuesday, 4 December

Wednesday, 5 December

Thursday, 6 December

Friday, 7 December

References

External links
 Official homepage

2018
2018 in cue sports
2018 in English sport
2018 sports events in London
2016
December 2018 sports events in the United Kingdom
Alexandra Palace